On distant shores is a 1958 Soviet-era Azerbaijani war film. Co-written by Imran Gasimov, Hasan Seyidbeyli, directed by Tofig Taghizade, the film portrays the life of the legendary Azerbaijani guerrilla of the Second World War Mehdi Huseynzade, who fought the Nazi forces in the present-day Italy and Slovenia, hence the film`s name On distant shores referring to the Adriatic Sea.

Plot
Mehdi Huseynzade a.k.a. Mihajlo is the most wanted guerrilla in Yugoslavia and Trieste. Disguised as a Wehrmacht officer, Mehdi plots and successfully performs a terror act in a restaurant full of German officers. However, he is wounded by a spy (Carranti) infiltrated in the guerrilla forces. While recovering Mehdi is out of operations for a while. He occasionally paints and daydreams of returning to his native Baku after the war. 
While the Germans increase the award for Mihajlo, he carries out another daring operation on getting food supply from a wealthy Italian businessman for partisans.

Mihajlo usually plans and carries out his operations with his brother-in-arm Veselin and a young girl named Anzhelika. The three are parts of a love triangle at the same time. Veselin loves Anzhelika, while she has a crush on Mihajlo. The latter also has some feelings to Anzhelika, but concentrates his attention on operations.

During the next operation Anzhelika is detained by the Germans, but she still manages to pass the necessary information to Mihajlo and Veselin. Thanks to the information, the two successfully accomplish the mission of exploding a movie theater and killing hundreds of German officers and escape from the chasing soldiers.

While the Germans start a massive search of Mihajlo, he encounters with Major Schulz, who is suspicious and about to detain him. However, claiming to be a poor, half-German, half-French painter by name Auguste Kraus, Mihajlo demonstrates his painting skills by creating a Schulz portrait. Believing that he is a painter, not a guerrilla, Schulz has no choice, but let go of Mihajlo. But when leaving Schulz`s office, Mihajlo meets Veselin, and the two draw attention of nearby German soldiers and get engaged in a combat. The friends still manage to escape but mortally wounded Veselin dies in Mihajlo`s arms.

Back in the guerrilla camp, Mihajlo receives another bad news: Anzhelika was also murdered. The revenge of outrageous Mihajlo turns to be costly for the Germans, as he explodes several hotels and facilities.

Mihajlo then finds Carranti and kills him before he manages to escape with a suitcase of money. Chased by the German soldiers, Mihajlo arrives in the village of Veselin`s father. The Germans led by Schulz also come to the village and demand the local population reveal Mihajlo`s whereabouts. While the locals do not betray him, Mihajlo does not want to put their lives under risk either. He leaves the house of Veselin`s father and appears in front of Schulz, who to his horror realizes Mihajlo and Kraus are the same person. Mihajlo manages to murder Schulz but gets shot by the German soldiers. Again daydreaming of returning Baku in his last breathe, Mihajlo falls down, but the activated bomb on him explodes and kills the approaching soldiers.

Cast
 Nodar Shashigoglu as Mehdi Huseynzade (Mihajlo)
 Yury Bogolyubov as Veselin
 Aydar Yelikoyeva as Anzhelika
 Alasgar Alakbarov as Ferrero
 Lev Bordukov as Carranti
 Andrei Fajt as Maselli

External links

 On distant shores (Russian)

1950s war films
Soviet war films
Soviet-era Azerbaijanian films
Azerbaijani-language films
Azerbaijanfilm films
Azerbaijani war films
Soviet World War II films